SOGAZ is a Russian insurance company. SOGAZ became the first in Russia by written premium (₽142.8 billion or US$2.3 billion) and market share (12.1%) in 2016.
The company was formed in 1993 and has direct business in Russia and Serbia. Insurance company SOGAZ as well have shares in many companies and own a number of insurers.

SOGAZ partners are leading worldwide reinsurance companies: Munich Re, Hannover Re, Partner Re, Swiss Re, SCOR, Lloyd's of London, and others. SOGAZ  - in accordance with national laws - is ceding 10% of total ceded risks under insurance contracts to Russian National Reinsurance Company (RNRC).

Credit ratings

SOGAZ become the first Russian insurer assigned a long-term credit rating "BBB+" in Russian and foreign currency with a "stable" outlook by Dagong Chinese Rating Agency. A.M. Best has affirmed for SOGAZ (Russia) the Financial Strength Rating of "B++" (Good) and the Long-Term Issuer Credit Rating of "bbb" and revised the outlooks to "stable" from "negative".

 Standard & Poor’s
The Standard & Poor's rating agency first assigned SOGAZ a long-term insurer financial strength and issuer credit ratings in 2008. Since then, the ratings has gradually grown and in 2018 the agency assigned a ratings of "BBB" with a "stable" outlook, which was then annually confirmed. At the beginning of 2021, the company had a 'BBB" ratings with "stable" outlook».

 Expert RA
In July 2003, the Expert RA rating agency assigned SOGAZ the highest "A++" rating (by national rating scale). Since then, the rating has never been reduced and in July 2017, when switching to a new rating scale, it was replaced with the “ruAAA” rating. At the beginning of 2022, the rating was “ruAAA”, the outlook is “stable”.

Acquisitions
SOGAZ carries out a consistent and active policy on the purchase of attractive insurance assets. The objects of such purchases are always captive insurers and insurance companies focused on corporate insurance, except VTB Insurance which had been a subsidiary of VTB Bank. SOGAZ acquired 7 notable companies in the Russian insurance market:
 Neftepolis (2005, formerly owned by Rosneft);
 Sheksna (2009, Severstal);
 Insurance company  Transneft (2013, Transneft);
 Insurance company Alrosa (2014, Alrosa);
 ZHASO (2016, Russian Railways);
 Regiongarant (2017, Surgutex);
VTB Insurance (2018, VTB Bank).

In December 2021 SOGAZ has also acquired all 45% indirect stake of USM, headed by Alisher Usmanov, in VK (company), mentioned as a strategic investment for the buyer.

References

External links
 Official site of Sogaz 
 Bloomberg -- Company Overview of Insurance Company of Gaz Industry SOGAZ 
 A.M. Best Revises Outlooks to Stable for INSURANCE COMPANY OF GAZ INDUSTRY SOGAZ
 SOGAZ acquires largest reinsurance capacity in the market

Insurance companies of Russia
Financial services companies established in 1993
Companies based in Moscow